Human Ape is a 2008 National Geographic documentary film on the genetic and evolutionary origins of human behavior, and covers the genetic and behavioural similarities and differences between humans and other great apes. The award-winning independent production company Pioneer Productions of London was commissioned by National Geographic Channels International to produce Human Ape.

Pioneer’s expertise with special effects are showcased in documentary films such as The Living Body, Life Before Birth, In the Womb: Animals, In The Womb: Multiples and The Body Atlas, all of which used wide-ranging techniques to explore the inner world of the living organisms.

Human Ape was executive produced by Stuart Carter for Pioneer Productions and directed by Martin Gorst. It was commissioned by Sydney Suissa, Executive Vice President (Content), National Geographic Channels International, and distributed by National Geographic Channel and Granada International.

The show was aired on both the US and internationally on National Geographic Channel beginning in March 2008.

Human Ape includes brief actual footage of human and ape activities in controlled experiments, as well as state-of-the-art computer-generated imagery (CGI) to examine the relationship between humankind and our simian cousins, with whom we share 99% of our genetic material. It also tracks the progress of a human and ape from the womb to early development and beyond, analysing how both develop cognitive abilities, communicate through emotions and language, use violence and sex, and utilise tools to manipulate their environment.

Bonobos and orangutans living at Great Ape Trust of Iowa are prominently featured in the documentary film. Bonobos Kanzi and Panbanisha and orangutans Knobi and Azy are extensively shown in the film, with detailed inputs from the Great Ape Trust scientists, Dr. Rob Shumaker, director of orangutan research, and William Fields, director of bonobo research.

The Pioneer Productions crew filmed at Great Ape Trust in April 2007, where footage included mirror self-recognition exercises. It also includes some exciting experiments like the apes counting and identifying the numbers from 1 to 10, not only with accuracy, but also with such speed that would put a human to shame. Whereas the human child is shown to be imitating the steps taken by one researcher to open a box and get a reward, the apes quickly eliminate the redundant steps. Such experiments are counter-intuitive and offer great deal of insights into the inner wiring and workings of the human and simian brains.

The film also briefly touches upon the relationship between the modified FOXP2 gene and the human language development. It documents a British family with a mutated FOXP2 gene which severely affects speech of its members.

Stuart Carter, Managing Director, Pioneer Productions was quoted by the website:

"We have long had a fascination with our genetic similarities to apes, and this film explores the question of how far these similarities go. Pioneer Productions specialises in cutting-edge scientific documentaries and this 2 hour landmark programme provides viewers with a fascinating insight into what really makes us human."

The website also quotes Sydney Suissa, Executive Vice President of Content, National Geographic Channels International:

"With their capacity for memory, communication and even problem solving, apes may be more closely related to humans than we previously thought The Human Ape uses unique scientific research and some amazing 4d technology to examine our relationship with apes, enlightening viewers about our primate cousins."

Al Setka, Great Ape Trust communications director, is also quoted by the site:

"For decades, the world has been educated and entertained by National Geographic documentaries. This film, Human Ape, continues in that tradition and will communicate to viewers the scientific importance of studying ape culture, language, tool use and intelligence."

See also
Kanzi
Panbanisha
Sue Savage-Rumbaugh

References

External links
  https://web.archive.org/web/20090106023725/http://www.greatapetrust.org./media/releases/2008/nr_13a08.php
  http://channel.nationalgeographic.com/episode/human-ape-3173/Overview#tab-facts
  Kanzi: The Ape at the Brink of the Human Mind [Paperback]
  Kanzi: The Ape at the Brink of the Human Mind
 " ...remarkable story of a "talking" chimp, a leading scientist, and the profound insights they have uncovered about our species  
 "... featured in cover stories in Time, Newsweek, and National Geographic ... subject of a "NOVA" documentary ... directly responsible for discoveries ... forced the scientific community ...recast its thinking ... nature of the mind and the origins of language ... Kanzi ... overturned the idea that symbolic language is unique to our species..."  
 The 'Human Ape' documentary

National Geographic (American TV channel) original programming
Works about genetics